Laurent Nottale (born 29 July 1952) is an astrophysicist, a retired director of research at CNRS, and a researcher at the Paris Observatory. He is the author and inventor of the theory of scale relativity, which aims to unify quantum physics and relativity theory.

Scientific career
Nottale began his professional work in the domain of general relativity. He defended his PhD Thesis in June 1980, entitled "Perturbation of the Hubble relation by clusters of galaxies", in which he showed that clusters of galaxies as a whole may act as gravitational lenses on distant sources. Some of these results were reported in Nature.

He also published a popular book L'Univers et la Lumière, Flammarion, Nouvelle Bibliothèque Scientifique 1994, Champs 1998) for which he received a prize in 1995 (Prix du livre d'Astronomie Haute-Maurienne-Vanoise).

According to Vincent Bontems and  there are two distinct phases in Nottale's scientific career. From 1975 to 1991 this included conventional topics, such as gravitational lenses, while from 1984 onwards he focused on developing his theory of scale relativity, a proposal for a theory of physics based on fractal space-time.

Nottale and scale relativity theory
Scale relativity claims to extend the concept of relativity to physical scales (of time, length, energy, or momentum). 
Proponents have made wide-ranging claims on its behalf, including applications to the existence of dark matter and the formation of planetary systems, as well as to biology, geology, and the technological singularity. 
Nottale, himself, did not study technological singularities. 
The proposal has not attracted wide acceptance by the scientific community.

Selected publications
 Scale Relativity And Fractal Space-Time: A New Approach to Unifying Relativity and Quantum Mechanics. 2011 1st ed. World Scientific Publishing Company.
 Fractal Space-Time and Micro-physics, Editions World Scientific, May 1993 (The reference book about Scale Relativity theory).
 L'univers et la lumière, Cosmologie classique et mirages gravitationnels, Éditions Flammarion, août 1993
 La Relativité dans tous ses états : du mouvements aux changements d'échelle, Éditions Hachette, 1998
 Les arbres de l'évolution, Laurent Nottale, Jean Chaline et Pierre Grou, Éditions Hachette, mars 2000

See also
 Fractal cosmology

References

External links 
 Laurent Nottale's personal page
 265 articles on line (1975-2021) : Google Scholar

1952 births
French cosmologists
Philosophers of cosmology
French relativity theorists
Living people
Research directors of the French National Centre for Scientific Research